Meddings is a surname. Notable people with the surname include:

 Danny Meddings (born 1968), English squash player
 Derek Meddings (1931-1995), British film and television special effects designer
 Edgar Meddings (1923-2020), British bobsledder
 Kevin Meddings (born 1941), Australian footballer
 Richard Meddings (born 1958), British banker